
Karkonosze County is a unit of territorial administration and local government (powiat) in Lower Silesian Voivodeship, south-western Poland. It came into being on January 1, 1999, as a result of the Polish local government reforms passed in 1998.

Its administrative seat is the city of Jelenia Góra, although this city is not part of the county (it forms a separate city county, which is an enclave within Karkonosze County). There are four towns within the county: Karpacz, Szklarska Poręba, Kowary and Piechowice. The first two of these are major ski resorts.

As at 2019 the total population of the county is 63,639, out of which the population of the towns totals 28,213 and the rural population is 35,426.

Until July 2020 it was named Jelenia Góra County. The change formally took effect on January 1, 2021. The current name references the Karkonosze Mountains.

Neighbouring counties
Apart from the city of Jelenia Góra, Karkonosze County is bordered by Lwówek Śląski County and Złotoryja County to the north, and Jawor County and Kamienna Góra County to the east. It also borders the Czech Republic to the south and west.

Administrative division
The county is subdivided into nine gminas (four urban and five rural). These are listed in the following table, in descending order of population.

References

 
Land counties of Lower Silesian Voivodeship